KVSM (1380 kHz) is a commercial AM radio station licensed to Santa Maria, California, United States and broadcasting to the Santa Maria area. The station is owned by Cristian Martinez and airs a regional Mexican music format. KVSM is rebroadcast on FM translator K271BV in Orcutt on 102.1 MHz.

History
The station was assigned the KVSM call letters on July 24, 2013.

In August 2017, Ether Mining Group sold KVSM to Cristian Martinez for $300,000 plus a time brokerage arrangement; this transaction also included usage rights to FM translator K271BV in Orcutt, owned by Edgewater Broadcasting. The sale closed in December that same year.

References

External links

VSM
Radio stations established in 2017
2017 establishments in California
VSM